Cyclopentadienylcobalt dicarbonyl is an organocobalt compound with formula (C5H5)Co(CO)2, abbreviated CpCo(CO)2. It is an example of a half-sandwich complex.  It is a dark red air sensitive liquid.  This compound features one cyclopentadienyl ring that is bound in an η5-manner and two carbonyl ligands. The compound is soluble in common organic solvents.

Preparation
CpCo(CO)2 was first reported in 1954 by Piper, Cotton, and Wilkinson who produced it by the reaction of cobalt carbonyl with cyclopentadiene. It is prepared commercially by the same method:
 Co2(CO)8 + 2 C5H6 → 2 C5H5Co(CO)2 +  H2 + 4 CO

Alternatively, it is generated by the high pressure carbonylation of bis(cyclopentadienyl)cobalt (cobaltocene) at elevated temperature and pressures:
Co(C5H5)2 + 2 CO → C5H5Co(CO)2 + "C5H5"
The compound is identified by strong bands in its IR spectrum at 2030 and 1960 cm−1.

Reactions
CpCo(CO)2 catalyzes the cyclotrimerization of alkynes. The catalytic cycle begins with dissociation of one CO ligand forming bis(alkyne) intermediate.
CpCo(CO)2 + 2 R2C2 → CpCo(R2C2)2 + 2 CO

This reaction proceeds by formation of metal-alkyne complexes by dissociation of CO. Although monoalkyne complexes CpCo(CO)(R1C2R2) have not been isolated, their analogues, CpCo(PPh3)(R1C2R2) are made by the following reactions:

CpCo(CO)2 + PR3  →  CO + CpCo(CO)(PR3)
CpCoL(PR3) + R2C2  →  L + CpCo(PR3)(R2C2)  (where L = CO or PR3)

CpCo(CO)2 catalyzes the formation of pyridines from a mixture of alkynes and nitriles.  Reduction of CpCo(CO)2 with sodium yields the dinuclear radical [Cp2Co2(CO)2]−, which reacts with alkyl halides to give the dialkyl complexes [Cp2Co2(CO)2R2]. Ketones are produced by carbonylation of these dialkyl complexes, regenerating CpCo(CO)2.

Related compounds
The pentamethylcyclopentadienyl analogue Cp*Co(CO)2 (CAS RN#12129-77-0) is well studied.  The Rh and Ir analogues, CpRh(CO)2 (CAS RN#12192-97-1) and CpIr(CO)2 (CAS RN#12192-96-0), are also well known.

References

Cyclopentadienyl complexes
Carbonyl complexes
Organocobalt compounds
Half sandwich compounds